Ulf Schramm is a Swedish former footballer. Schramm was part of the Djurgårdens IF Swedish champions' team of 1964. He made 15 Allsvenskan appearances for Djurgården and scored three goals

Honours
Djurgårdens IF
 Allsvenskan: 1964

References

Swedish footballers
Allsvenskan players
Djurgårdens IF Fotboll players
Association footballers not categorized by position